Magdalena Warakomska (born 27 March 1997) is a Polish short track speed skater. She competed in the women's 500 metres at the 2018 Winter Olympics.

References

1997 births
Living people
Polish female short track speed skaters
Olympic short track speed skaters of Poland
Short track speed skaters at the 2018 Winter Olympics
Sportspeople from Białystok